are a type of bronze mirror that was popular in the late Han dynasty in China. They were imported from the Yayoi period to the Kofun period, along with imitations made by Yayoi.

History 
They flourished in China in the early Han dynasty and were distributed mainly north of the Yellow River basin. It is thought that Inscribed mirrors, which have a series of inward arcs, were created by replacing the beveled thunder pattern, and it is characterized by a flat geometric pattern.

Design 
The mirrors often have no inscriptions other than four words of good fortune in a four-leaf or four-linked arc pattern on the knob. A mirror with an uchigyo hana design in the collection of Harvard University Art Museums was made in the 7th year of Eihei (64) at a private workshop called Gongsunke. The piece was priced at 300 sen (less than the monthly salary of a low-ranking official), which suggests that it was a daily commodity.

They have been excavated in various places in China, as well as in the Yayoi and Kofun periods in Japan and in the Lappan tumulus in Korea, with many examples from the early and middle Kofun period.

This mirror has a pattern consisting of eight basic arcs arranged inwardly around a knob at the center of the back of the mirror. However, rare mirrors have been found with 11, 9, 6, and 5 arcs. Officially, these mirrors are called "mirrors with a continuous arc pattern," but in Japan they are called "mirrors with an uchigyo hana design" because the design is compared to petals.

Variations range from palm-sized mirrors to much larger mirrors used in rituals. Mirrors with a bead pattern placed on the knob holder, and mirrors with a straight-arc border with a pattern using straight lines and circles have been found. Some of these mirrors have a variety of images formed between the arcs and the button heads.

Discoveries 
A Large Flower Mirror with a diameter of 46.5 cm was included in a batch of artifacts excavated from the Hirabaru Square Trench Tombs in Fukuoka Prefecture, which was designated a National Treasure in 2006. It is the largest copper mirror excavated in Japan to date.

In 2017, a Flower Mirror in near perfect condition with little rust was excavated at the Nakajima Ruins in Iseida, Hakata-ku, Fukuoka City.

References

Bibliography

See Also 

 National Treasure (Japan)
 Itokoku
 
 Yata no Kagami
 Large Flower Mirror
 Inscribed mirror

External links 

 糸島市伊都国歴史博物館
Bronze mirrors
History of Japan
Pages with unreviewed translations